Lieutenant William Harry Bland (6 June 1898 in Karachi, Sind, Presidency of Bombay, Raj of India, British Empire – 24 October 1962 in Vancouver, British Columbia, Canada) was a British World War I flying ace credited with seven aerial victories.

Biography
Bland was commissioned as a temporary second lieutenant on probation from cadet on 10 January 1918, and was confirmed in that rank on 15 May 1918.

He was posted to 65 Squadron flying the Sopwith Camel, and between September and November 1918 he downed seven Fokker D.VIIs.

He was awarded the Croix de Guerre with Bronze Star by France in April 1919.
 
Bland was transferred to the unemployed list on 30 July 1919.

References

1898 births
1962 deaths
Royal Flying Corps officers
British World War I flying aces
Royal Air Force personnel of World War I
Recipients of the Croix de Guerre 1914–1918 (France)
British people in colonial India
British emigrants to Canada